The canton of Château-Gontier-sur-Mayenne-2 (before March 2020: canton of Château-Gontier) is an administrative division of the Mayenne department, northwestern France. It was created at the French canton reorganisation which came into effect in March 2015. Its seat is in Château-Gontier-sur-Mayenne.

It consists of the following communes:
 
Bouchamps-lès-Craon
Château-Gontier-sur-Mayenne (partly)
Chérancé
Craon
Denazé
Marigné-Peuton
Mée
Niafles
Peuton
Pommerieux
Prée-d'Anjou
Saint-Quentin-les-Anges

References

Cantons of Mayenne